Below is a list of the 15 most ejected managers in Major League Baseball history as of the 2021 season. Former Atlanta Braves manager Bobby Cox holds the record with 162.

 Bold denotes active manager
 † denotes manager has been inducted into the National Baseball Hall of Fame

References

Managers